Huang Shixie (1920 – November 11, 2012) was a Chinese ambassador.
 From June 1972 to August 1977 was ambassador in Kigali (Rwanda).
 From August 1977 to November 1981 was ambassador in Aden (South Yemen).
 From June 1982 to May 1985 he was ambassador to Amman (Jordan).

References

1920 births
2012 deaths
Ambassadors of China to Rwanda
Ambassadors of China to Yemen
Ambassadors of China to Jordan